The 2002–03 season saw Dundee compete in the Scottish Premier League where they finished in 6th position with 44 points. They also reached the 2003 Scottish Cup Final where they lost 1–0 to Rangers.

Final league table

Results
Dundee's score comes first

Legend

Scottish Premier League

Scottish Cup

Scottish League Cup

References

External links
 Dundee 2002–03 at Soccerbase.com (select relevant season from dropdown list)

Dundee F.C. seasons
Dundee